Gambara may refer to:

People
Gambara, the seeress, a legendary pagan priestess among the Lombards
Carlo Antonio Gambara, Italian composer
Gastone Gambara (1890-1962), Italian general
Gianfrancesco Gambara (1533-1587), Italian cardinal
Lattanzio Gambara (1530-1574), Italian painter
Lorenzo Gambara (c 1496-1586), Italian priest
Paola Gambara Costa (1463-1515), Italian nun
Uberto Gambara (1489-1549), Italian cardinal
Veronica Gambara (1485-1550), Italian noblewoman

Places
Gambara, an Italian town and commune
Gambara (Milan Metro), a metro station in Milan, Italy

Other uses
Gambara (short story), a short story by Honoré de Balzac